A series of books by author David Drake. In 1997, Drake began his largest fantasy series, Lord of the Isles, using elements of Sumerian religion and medieval era technology. The series consists of nine books broken into two distinct parts, the Lord of the Isles consisting of the first six books, and a final trilogy dubbed the Crown of the Isles.

Novels

 Lord of the Isles
 Lord of the Isles (1997)
 Queen of Demons (1998)
 Servant of the Dragon (1999)
 Mistress of the Catacombs (2001)
 Goddess of the Ice Realm (2003)
 Master of the Cauldron (2004)

 Crown of the Isles trilogy
 The Fortress of Glass (2006)
 The Mirror of Worlds (2007)
 The Gods Return (2008)

 Short stories
 "The Elf House" (2004, published in Masters of Fantasy)

Main characters
Garric or-Reise
Sharina os-Reise
Cashel or-Kenset
Ilna os-Kenset
Tenoctris the Wizard (bos-Tandor)
Liane bos-Benliman

Other characters

Recurring characters
Reise or-Laver (Garric and Sharina's father)
Lora (Garric and Sharina's mother)
Katchin or-Keldan (Cashel and Ilna's uncle)
Kenset or-Keldan (Cashel and Ilna's father)
Nonnus or-Bran (A quiet hermit close to Sharina)
King Carus (The ancient king who dwells in Garric's mind)
Lord Waldron (commander of the Army) bor-Warriman
Lord Tadai (Lord Chamberlain) bor-Tithain
Lord Royhas (Lord Chancellor) bor-Bolliman
Lord Attaper (Commander of the Blood Eagles, the noble-born Praetorian Guard of the series)
Admiral Zettin (Lord High Admiral)
Captain Chalcus (ex-pirate, Ilna's lover)
Lady Merota (orphan noble, Ilna's ward)
Rasile (cat-woman wizard)

Featured characters
Asera bos-Gezaman (Procurator)
Meder bor-Mederman (Wizard)
The Dragon (lizard-man wizard)
Goddess of the Ice Realm (half-human hell-bent woman)
The Hooded One (undead wizard)

Other characters
 Count of Blaise
 Duke of Sandrakkan
 Count of Haft
 Count Lascarg
 Duke of Yole
 Valence III, King of the Isles
 The Shepherd (Great God)
 The Lady (Great Goddess)
 The Sister (Great Goddess)
 Duzi (minor god)

General outline

The books center on the lives of four youths from a small village on one of the islands that make up the archipelago of the book's world, known as the Isles. In the first novel, the character Garric or-Reise discovers that he is, in fact, the direct descendant of the last king to rule the Isles, exactly a millennium ago. Then, as now, the power that fueled all magic in the world rose precipitously, allowing the use of spells so powerful that they shattered the cohesion of nations, driving them apart and in the process killing Garric's ancestor, Carrus, and sinking the island of Yole.

The novels deal with Garric's claim to the throne of the Isles, and his attempts to unite them once again. In the process, he and his companions are challenged by foes both physical and supernatural, which they must overcome. The basic outline of many of the novels deals with the characters being split apart, often taken to parallel universes or distant periods in time, by some hostile entity or group, which they must then defeat before, or in the process of, re-uniting.

Magic in the series is based on a now-dead language, the Old Script. Its characters are usually drawn using an athame (made of a variety of substances including iron, twigs and ivory) and the words spoken aloud. The introduction states that these are actual incantations from the Classical world.

The Isles
 Atara
 First Atara
 Second Atara
 Third Atara
 Bight—Home isle of the Hairy Men
 Blaise—Powerful isle originally opposed to Garric's rule.
 Bowwkan
 Cordin
 Dalopo
 Gharax
 Haft—Home isle of the four main characters from Barca's Hamlet.
 Kanbesa
 Kepulakecil
 Laut
 Ornifal—Current location of the nominal official government of the Isle's and Liane's home.
 Pandah—Central isle
 Pare
 Pewle—Located outside the Isles proper
 Sandrakkan—Powerful isle originally opposed to Garric's rule.
 Seres
 Shengy—Grows bananas
 Sirimat—Home to man-eating trees
 Tegma—Sunken isle, once home to the Archai, a prehuman insectoid race. Now a breeding ground for seawolves.
 Telut
 Tisamur—Grows pineapples
 Volita
 Yole—Now sunk
 Western continent—Possibly mythical

References

External links
 The Lord of the Isles series page at Tor Books

Fantasy novel series
American fantasy novel series